KBFL-FM (99.9 FM) is a radio station licensed to Fair Grove, Missouri. The station was previously owned by Meyer-Baldridge, Inc. The station is simulcast on KBFL and translator K245CA 96.9 FM.

On March 2, 2015, KBFL-FM flipped to the “Outlaw Nation” format; the Music of Your Life format moved to KBFL. However, due to the overwhelming response of the format, Meyer announced that "The Outlaw" had moved to sister station KTXR November 2, 2015. A new format launched on KBFL-FM on the same day, and it turned out to be a simulcast of adult standards-formatted KBFL 1060 AM.

On July 24, 2020, it was announced that the sports format on KBFL’s sister station KWTO-FM (now KTXR) would be moving to the KBFL frequencies, and that the entire group of Meyer Communications owned radio stations were being purchased by Zimmer Midwest Communications. KBFL began simulcasting KWTO-FM on July 30, and unveiled a new logo reflecting the new frequencies "JOCK 96.9 FM 99.9 FM 1060 AM." ESPN on air promos branded the station as “ESPN the JOCK”.

As of August 7, 2020, "ESPN the JOCK" fully transitioned to KBFL and KBFL-FM and its 96.9 FM translator. 98.7 FM began broadcasting a soft rock format on August 11.

Previous logo

References

External links

BFL-FM
Sports radio stations in the United States
ESPN Radio stations
Radio stations established in 1988
1988 establishments in Missouri